The UEFA Youth League is an annual club football competition organised by the Union of European Football Associations (UEFA) since 2013. In its current format, it is contested by the youth  teams of the clubs competing in the UEFA Champions League group stage, plus the domestic youth champions of the best-ranked national associations.

The semi-finals and final matches have been traditionally played at the Colovray Stadium in Nyon, Switzerland. The winners are awarded the Lennart Johansson Trophy, named in honour of the former UEFA president.

The most successful teams are Barcelona and Chelsea, with two titles each. Chelsea won back-to-back titles in 2015 and 2016, while Barcelona won the inaugural season of the competition and clinched their second trophy in 2018. The current champions are Portuguese side Benfica, who beat Red Bull Salzburg 6–0 in the 2022 final.

History
In May 2010, UEFA organised a match, referred to as the "UEFA Under-18 Challenge", between the under-18 teams of Bayern Munich and Internazionale, three days prior to the UEFA Champions League Final between the respective senior sides. Internazionale won the match 2–0 with two goals from Denis Alibec. The match was part of "UEFA Grassroots Day", and acted as an inspiration for the UEFA Youth League.

The teams in the first tournament, 2013–14 UEFA Youth League, played a group stage with the same composition and calendar as the 2013–14 UEFA Champions League group stage, and was held on a 'trial basis'.

The eight group-winners and eight runners-up from group stage then participated in a knockout phase. Unlike the UEFA Champions League, the knockout phase had single-leg ties, with the semi-finals and final played at neutral venues.

British media commented that the competition was formed to displace the NextGen Series.

In April 2014, Barcelona became the first champion, beating Benfica by 3–0 in the final-four held in Nyon.

After a two-year trial period, the UEFA Youth League became a permanent UEFA competition starting from the 2015–16 season, with the tournament expanded from 32 to 64 teams to allow the youth domestic champions of the top 32 associations according to their UEFA country coefficients to also participate. The 32 UEFA Champions League group stage youth teams retain the group stage format, with the group winners advancing to the round of 16 and the runners-up advancing to the play-offs. The 32 youth domestic champions play two rounds of two-legged ties, with the eight winners advancing to the play-offs, where they play a single match at home against the Champions League path runners-up. The round of 16 onwards retain the same format of single-leg ties as before.

Finals
All semi-finals and finals to date have been played at Colovray Stadium, Nyon, Switzerland.

Winners
By club

By country

Broadcasters

2021–2024 
Up to four matches per week (total 39 matches per-season) are streamed through UEFA.tv channel in the unsold markets with highlights available in all territories.

Europe

Outside Europe

See also
 NextGen Series
 Premier League International Cup

References

External links

Official website

 
Youth League
Sports leagues established in 2013
 
Multi-national association football leagues in Europe
European youth sports competitions
2013 establishments in Europe